In linguistics, a filler, filled pause, hesitation marker or planner is a sound or word that participants in a conversation use to signal that they are pausing to think but are not finished speaking. (These are not to be confused with placeholder names, such as thingamajig, whatchamacallit, whosawhatsa and whats'isface, which refer to objects or people whose names are temporarily forgotten, irrelevant, or unknown.) Fillers fall into the category of formulaic language, and different languages have different characteristic filler sounds. The term filler also has a separate use in the syntactic description of wh-movement constructions.

Usage 
Every conversation involves turn-taking, which means that whenever someone wants to speak and hears a pause, they do so. Pauses are commonly used to indicate that someone's turn has ended, which can create confusion when someone has not finished a thought but has paused to form a thought; in order to prevent this confusion, they will use a filler word such as um, er, or uh. The use of a filler word indicates that the other person should continue listening instead of speaking.

Filler words generally contain little to no lexical content, but instead provide clues to the listener about how they should interpret what the speaker has said. The actual words that people use may change (such as the increasing use of like), but the meaning and reason why people use them does not change.

In English
In American English, the most common filler sounds are ah or uh  and um  (er  and erm  in British English). Among younger speakers, the fillers "like", "you know", "I mean", "okay", "so", "actually", "basically", and "right?" are among the more prevalent. Christopher Hitchens described the use of the word "like" as a discourse marker or vocalized pause as a particularly prominent example of the "Californianization of American youth-speak", and its further recent spread throughout other English dialects via the mass-media.

In different languages 
 In American Sign Language, UM can be signed with open-8 held at chin, palm in, eyebrows down (similar to FAVORITE); or bilateral symmetric bent-V, palm out, repeated axial rotation of wrist (similar to QUOTE).
In Iraqi Arabic,  ("what's its name") is a filler.
 In Armenian, բան ("thing"), Միգուցե, ("maybe"), էլի ("c'mon") and ոնց որ ("as if") are common fillers.* 
 In Bislama,  is the common filler.
 In Catalan,  ("so"),  ("therefore"),  ("it means"), saps?
 In Danish,  is one of the most common fillers.
 In Estonian,  ("so") is one of the most common fillers.
Swearing is also used as a filler often, especially among youth.
So-called modal particles share some of the features of filler words, but they actually modify the sentence meaning.
 In Hebrew,  is the most common filler.  is also quite common. Millennials and the younger Generation X speakers commonly use  (the Hebrew version of "like").
Sound fillers include , अ (a, [ə]),.
Among intellectuals,  (if you like) is used as filler.
 In Kannada,  for "also",  for "the matter is" are common fillers.
 In Kyrgyz,   ("then", "so"),  ("that"),  ("that"),  ("this"),  ("um"), are common fillers.
 In Lithuanian,  ("you know"),  ("meaning"),  ("like") are some of common fillers.
 In Maltese and Maltese English,  ("then"), or just , is a common filler.
 In Mandarin Chinese, speakers often say ;  (pronounced nàge/nèige).
As well as in Arabic and Urdu,  ("I mean") is also used in Persian. Also,   is a common filler in Persian.
Other examples include,   (like English well),   ("you know").
 In Punjabi,  ("it means") is a common filler.
A modern filler has gained popularity among the youths – gen , analogous to the English "like", literally translated as "type".
 In Slovene,  ("indeed", "just", "merely"),  ("right?"),  ("well"), v bistvu ("in fact"), and pravzaprav ("actually")  are some of the most common fillers.
 In Spanish, fillers are called . Younger speakers there often use  (meaning "as", "like" or "in [noun] mode"). The Argentine filler word che became the nickname of rebel Ernesto "Che" Guevara, by virtue of his frequent use of it. Other possible filled pauses in Spanish are: a, am, bueno, como, and others.
 In Ukrainian,  (similar to "um"),  ("well"),  ("and"),  ("this"),  ("this one") are common fillers.
 In  Vietnamese (Tiếng Việt), "ơ" or "à" (surprise); "ý là" (I mean); ...

In syntax

The linguistic term "filler" has another, unrelated use in syntactic terminology. It refers to the pre-posed element that fills in the "gap" in a wh-movement construction. Wh-movement is said to create a long-distance or unbounded "filler-gap dependency". In the following example, there is an object gap associated with the transitive verb saw, and the filler is the wh-phrase how many angels: "I don't care [how many angels] she told you she saw."

See also 
 Interjection
 Like: as a discourse particle
 Phatic expression
 So (word)
 Speech disfluency

References

External links 
 Why do people say "um" and "er" when hesitating in their speech?, New Scientist, May 6, 1995 
  Citing  
 Nino Amiridze, Boyd H. Davis, and Margaret Maclagan, editors. Fillers, Pauses and Placeholders. Typological Studies in Language 93, John Benjamins, Amsterdam/Philadelphia, 2010. Review

Linguistics
Human communication